Matěj Hrabina (born 29 April 1993) is a Czech footballer who currently plays as a right back for FC Zbrojovka Brno.

Club career

FC Zbrojovka Brno
He signed for Zbrojovka Brno on 1 July 2021.

References

External links
 Profile at FC Zbrojovka Brno official site
 Profile at FAČR official site

1993 births
Living people
Czech footballers
FC Zbrojovka Brno players
Association football defenders
Czech National Football League players
Czech Republic youth international footballers
Sportspeople from Opava